The Taekwondo tournament is held since 2006. The first Games only saw the participation of the men's event.

Winners

Men's tournament
-58 kg
2009:  Pedro Póvoa
2006:  Gilvan Santos

-68 kg
2009:  Chandan Lakra
2006:  Marcos Gonçalves

-80 kg
2009:  Eloy Boa Morte
2006:  Douglas Marcelino

+80 kg
2009:  José Kuntgner
2006:  L. dos Santos

Women's tournament
-49 kg
2009:  Fernanda Silva

-57 kg
2009:  Ana Rita Lopes

-67 kg
2009:  Raphaella Pereira

+67 kg
2009:  Junnan Wang

 
Lusofonia Games
Sports at the Lusofonia Games
Lusophony Games